Soczewka  is a village in the administrative district of Gmina Nowy Duninów, within Płock County, Masovian Voivodeship, in east-central Poland.

The village has a population of 330.

References

Soczewka